is a song recorded by Hey! Say! 7 for Hey! Say! JUMP's second album JUMP World. The song is used for Yuri Chinen's  romantic comedy drama "Sprout!".

Composition
The lyrics were written by Hey! Say! JUMP member Ryosuke Yamada. The music and arrangement was done by Sugiyama Katsuhiko and Ogura Shinkō.

Credits and personnel
Personnel
Songwriting – Ryosuke Yamada
Production  – Sugiyama Katsuhiko and Ogura Shinkō.

Charts
The album containing the song peaked at number 1 spot prior to its debut released.

References

Hey! Say! JUMP songs